Thomas Downing may be:
Thomas Downing (restaurateur) (1791–1866), American abolitionist and restaurateur
Thomas Downing (athlete) (1883–1943), Irish middle distance runner
Thomas Downing (painter) (1928–1985), American painter
Thomas N. Downing (1919–2001), American politician